The Americas Zone was one of the three zones of the regional Davis Cup competition in 1993.

In the Americas Zone there were three different tiers, called groups, in which teams competed against each other to advance to the upper tier. Winners in Group III advanced to the Americas Zone Group II in 1994. All other teams remained in Group III.

Participating nations

Draw
 Venue: Cariari Country Club, San José, Costa Rica
 Date: 8–14 March

  and  promoted to Group II in 1994.

Results

Barbados vs. Eastern Caribbean

Bolivia vs. Guatemala

Costa Rica vs. El Salvador

Jamaica vs. Trinidad and Tobago

Barbados vs. El Salvador

Bolivia vs. Jamaica

Costa Rica vs. Trinidad and Tobago

Eastern Caribbean vs. Guatemala

Barbados vs. Jamaica

Bolivia vs. Trinidad and Tobago

Costa Rica vs. Guatemala

Eastern Caribbean vs. El Salvador

Barbados vs. Bolivia

Costa Rica vs. Eastern Caribbean

El Salvador vs. Jamaica

Guatemala vs. Trinidad and Tobago

Barbados vs. Trinidad and Tobago

Bolivia vs. Costa Rica

Eastern Caribbean vs. Jamaica

El Salvador vs. Guatemala

Barbados vs. Guatemala

Bolivia vs. El Salvador

Costa Rica vs. Jamaica

Eastern Caribbean vs. Trinidad and Tobago

Barbados vs. Costa Rica

Bolivia vs. Eastern Caribbean

El Salvador vs. Trinidad and Tobago

Guatemala vs. Jamaica

References

External links
Davis Cup official website

Davis Cup Americas Zone
Americas Zone Group III